Sub•Lime Records was a short lived Christian record label. They were a sublabel of Essential Records, and by extension Brentwood Music (Based in Brentwood, Tennessee) and the Zomba Music Group. Their records were distributed by Provident Music Distribution. Signed artists included Honey, Fold Zandura, Kosmos Express, Quayle, Ruby Joe, and Silage.

See also
 List of record labels

References
"Contact Sub•Lime Records", from sublimerecords.com, now hosted at the Internet Archive.
"Essential Records:  F.A.Q", from essentialrecords.com, now hosted at the Internet Archive.
"Essential Records: The Office Camera", from essentialrecords.com, now hosted at the Internet Archive.
"City on a Hill, Essential Records Press Release", archived at jarchives.com.

Christian record labels
Defunct record labels of the United States